"Epic" is a song by Dutch producers Sandro Silva and Quintino and produced by Silva, Quintino, and Maarten Vorwerk, released on 3 October 2011. It is considered the first true big room house song. The single became a success in The Netherlands by reaching the peak position in both the Dutch Top 40 and the Mega Single Top 100 (see charts and certifications). "Epic" is the twelfth full instrumental number-one hit in the Dutch Top 40. The track was also featured on Swedish House Mafia's compilation album Until Now.

It is considered one of the most popular big room house songs of all-time, along with "Animals" by Martin Garrix, "Spaceman" by Hardwell, "Tsunami" by Dvbbs and Borgeous and "Tremor" by Dimitri Vegas & Like Mike.

will.i.am caused controversy with his track "Bang Bang" as the drop is extremely similar to the drop from this track, but no permission was used. will.i.am was involved in another sampling scandal on the same album. Eventually, all three of the songwriters of "Epic" were added to the credits of "Bang Bang".

Charts and certifications

Weekly charts

Year-end charts

See also
List of Dutch Top 40 number-one singles of 2011

References

2011 singles
Dutch Top 40 number-one singles
Spinnin' Records singles